The Martwa Wisła (both literally "dead Vistula") is a river, one of the branches of the Vistula, flowing through the city of Gdańsk in northern Poland.

It got its name when this branch of the river became increasingly moribund. A harbor canal was constructed with the Westerplatte on one of its banks. It was constructed to flow through Danzig (Gdańsk) into the Danziger Bucht, now Gdańsk Bay. Its river mouth and environs double as a harbor channel for the Inner Port of the port of Gdańsk.

See also
Baltic Sea
Battle of Westerplatte
Wisłoujście Fortress

External links 

0Martwa Wisła
Rivers of Poland
Rivers of Pomeranian Voivodeship